Live from the 9:30 Club: Bootleg No. 3 is the third live album released by the Denver-based rock band the Fray, released as both a CD and a digital download for those who pre-ordered their second album, The Fray. It was recorded during the Fray's club tour in January 2009, shortly before the release of The Fray on 2 February 2009.

Track list
 Say When – 5:01
 Enough For Now – 4:14
 You Found Me – 4:02
 We Build Then We Break – 3:48
 Happiness – 5:24

References

The Fray albums
2009 EPs